Miguel Ângelo Saraiva Miranda (born October 9, 1978, Porto) is a Portuguese basketball player, currently playing for FC Porto.

Honours
FC Porto
 Portuguese League: 1996–97, 1998–99, 2010–11
 Portuguese Cup: 1996–97, 1998–99, 1999–00, 2011–12
 Portuguese League Cup: 1999–00, 2011–12
 Portuguese Supercup: 1997, 1999, 2011, 2016
 António Pratas Trophy: 2011

CA Queluz
 Portuguese League: 2004–05
 Portuguese Cup: 2004–05
 Portuguese Supercup: 2005

Ovarense
 Portuguese League: 2006–07, 2007–08
 Portuguese Cup: 2008–09
 Portuguese Supercup: 2006, 2007, 2008
 António Pratas Trophy: 2009, 2014
 Champions Tournament: 2006–07, 2007–08

External links
 LCB Profile
 EuroBasket 2007 Profile

1978 births
Living people
Portuguese men's basketball players
Power forwards (basketball)
Centers (basketball)
Sportspeople from Porto
FC Porto basketball players